Clinchmore is an unincorporated community in Campbell County, Tennessee. Clinchmore is a small, rural, town in Tennessee, with the population of 273 people.

References

Unincorporated communities in Campbell County, Tennessee
Unincorporated communities in Tennessee
Coal towns in Tennessee